The Brooklin Lacrosse Club is a box lacrosse team from Brooklin, Ontario.  Brooklin plays in the Major Series Lacrosse (MSL) league (formerly known as Senior "A"). The MSL, and its counterpart, the Western Lacrosse Association, represent the highest level of competitive box lacrosse in Canada. Both league champions compete each September for the Mann Cup, one of the most historic and treasured sports trophies in Canada.

Throughout team history, the Brooklin Lacrosse Club has always been a community based team that represents the best box lacrosse players from Brooklin, Whitby, Durham and nearby regions. The lacrosse club is a non-profit, volunteer operated organization.

The team was formerly known as the Brooklin Redmen, a name the team had held since 1966. On April 20, 2019, the team released a statement that it would be dropping the "Redmen" as the team name owing to a growing sensitivity to the use of Native Americans as logos and names for sports teams.

Championships 

Mann Cup Canadian Champions (7)

Ontario Senior Champions (10)

Season-by-season results

Awards 

Mike Kelly Memorial trophy (Mann Cup MVP)

 1968 – Joe Tomchyshyn
 1969 – Bill Squire
 1985 – Wayne Colley
 1987 – Jim Meredith
 1990 – Paul Gait
 2000 – Nick Trudeau

Bucko MacDonald Trophy (top scorer)

 1969 – Elmer Tran
 1980 – Ken Colley
 1985 – Gil Nieuwendyk
 1986 – John Fusco
 1987 – Derek Keenan
 1988 – Derek Keenan
 1989 – Gary Gait
 1990 – Peter Parke
 1991 – Peter Parke
 1999 – Shawn Williams
 2001 – Shawn Williams
 2004 – Shawn Williams
 2007 – Shawn Williams
 2011 – Shawn Williams
 2012 – Shawn Williams

Jim Murphy Trophy (regular season MVP)

 1968 – Sandy Doberstein
 1985 – John Jordan
 1987 – Derek Keenan
 1988 – Derek Keenan
 1989 – Gary Gait
 1990 – Peter Parke
 1991 – John Fusco
 1994 – Paddy O'Toole
 1998 – Rob Blasdell
 2005 – Shawn Williams
 2007 – Shawn Williams
 2011 – Shawn Williams
 2017 – Reilly O'Connor

Gene Dopp Memorial Trophy (rookie of the year)

 1969 – Merv Marshall
 1977 – Stan Cockerton
 1980 – Ken Colley
 1983 – Gil Nieuwendyk
 1989 – Gary Gait
 2000 – Gavin Prout
 2008 – Derek Hopcroft

Merv McKnzie Trophy (most valuable defenceman)

 1967 – Bob Hanna
 1968 – Paul Tran
 1976 – Peter Vipond
 1978 – Jim Branton
 1980 – Blaine Harrison
 1982 – Fred Upshaw
 1983 – Blaine Harrison
 1987 – Kevin Antram
 1989 – Blane Harrison
 1992 – Greg Lepine
 1994 – Eric Perroni
 2004 – Derek Suddons
 2016 – Graeme Hossack
 2018 – Chris Corbeil

Harry Lumley Award (fewest goals against)

 1968 – Justin Howe
 1969 – Merv Marshall & Justin Howe
 1979 – Paul Boland, Kent Wentzell & Wayne Colley
 1980 – Wayne Colley & Kent Wentzell
 1981 – Wayne Colley & Kelvin Linton
 1983 – Wayne Colley & Paul Boland
 1987 – Wayne Colley & Ken Passfield
 1988 – Wayne Colley & Ted Sawicki
 1989 – Wayne Colley & Ted Sawicki
 1990 – Wayne Colley, Ken Passfeild & Chris O'Reilly
 1994 – Paddy O'Toole & Paul Mootz
 1999 – Rob Blasdell & Mike Wye
 2001 – Rob Blasdell, Gee Nash & Phil Wetherup
 2003 – Gee Nash, Ken Barrett & Scott Wylie

Current roster 

Goaltenders

Runners

Head coach
 Brad MacArthur
Assistant coaches
 Jason Crosbie
 Derek Suddons
Scouting director
 Clancy Almas
Video coach
 Ryan Preston
Equipment managers
 Paul Wade
 Greg Linton
Trainer
 Kaylin Fraser
General manager
 Brad MacArthur

Notable alumni 

 Shawn Williams
 Gavin Prout
 Brad MacArthur
 Gil Niewendyk
 Derek Keenan
 Derek Suddons
 Derek Hopcroft
 Dan Ball
 Stan Cockerton
 Wayne Colley
 Ken Colley
 Gary Gait
 Paul Gait
 Elmer Tran
 Paul Tran
 John Fusco
 Peter Parke
 Eric Perroni
 Andy Perroni
 Peter Vipond
 Mike Gray 
 Tom Wreggitt
 Bill Down
 Don Craggs
 Ken Lotton
 Glen Lotton
 Glen Clark
 Steve Toll
 Blaine Harrison
 Paul St. John
 Scott McMichael
 Ryan McMichael
 Mitch McMicahel 
 Dan Ladouceur 
 Brad Reed 
 Nick Trudeau
 John Jordan
 Bill Callan 
 Don "Sully" Vipond
 Emil Labaj

Hall of fame members 

 Canadian Lacrosse Hall of Fame 

In addition to these players, the 1985, 1986, 1987, 1988, 1989, 1990, and 1991 teams were inducted.

 Ontario Lacrosse Hall of Fame

Team records

References

External links 
 

Ontario Lacrosse Association teams
Sport in Whitby, Ontario